Breznički Hum is a village and municipality in Croatia in Varaždin County. According to the 2011 census, there are 1,356 inhabitants, absolute majority of whom are Croats.

References

Municipalities of Croatia
Populated places in Varaždin County